Monte Consolino is a mountain in the Serre Calabresi range, in the Vallata dello Stilaro of south-western Calabria, in southern Italy.
 
At the foot of Monte Consolino feet is the town of Stilo. The town of Pazzano is located nearby between this mountain and Monte Stella. Bivongi is also. It is separated from the Monte Mammicomito by a narrow valley, in which is the town of Pazzano.

History
On the mountain's top are the stone ruins of the Norman castle built by Roger II of Sicily (1095–1154).  Just below, are the ruins of the 'so-called' Byzantine kastrum.

Sources

 

Mountains of Calabria
Vallata dello Stilaro
Norman architecture in Italy
Ruins in Italy
Mountains of the Apennines